Glenea nitidicollis is a species of beetle in the family Cerambycidae. It was described by Per Olof Christopher Aurivillius in 1920.

Subspecies
 Glenea nitidicollis nitidicollis Aurivillius, 1920
 Glenea nitidicollis rufina Breuning, 1976

References

nitidicollis
Beetles described in 1920